Aleksandr Vinogradov may refer to:

 Aleksandr Vinogradov (canoeist) (born 1951), Russian sprint canoeist
 Aleksandr Vinogradov (ice hockey) (born 1970), Russian ice hockey player
 Aleksandr Vinogradov (writer) (1930–2011), Soviet and Russian journalist and writer

See also
 Alexander Vinogradov (disambiguation)